Trash We'd Love is the first full-length album released by The Hiatus on June 27, 2009. It reached No. 1 on the Oricon album chart. The cover was designed by Kaori Maki.

Track listing

References 

2009 debut albums
The Hiatus albums